Nova-111 is a 2015 science fiction adventure video game developed by Funktronic Labs and published by Curve Digital. It was released for macOS, Microsoft Windows, PlayStation 4, Xbox One, PlayStation 3, PlayStation Vita, and the Wii U in August and September 2015. A port for the Nintendo Switch was released in January 2022 and was published by No Gravity Games.

Gameplay
Players shoot their way through planets in an orange spaceship. The mission is to search for lost scientists in the aftermath of the science experiments.

Reception

Nova-111 received "mixed or average" reviews for Windows, PlayStation 4, and Nintendo Switch and "generally favorable" reviews for PlayStation Vita and Wii U. It was given a score of 7 out of 10 on Destructoid, which praised it for forcing the player to think in new ways in a way that games in established genres could rarely do. Pocket Gamer gave the game 3 stars out of 5, writing, "All in all, Nova-111 is a game that doesn't quite live up to the promise of its concept, and it's mostly down to relatively small mistakes. There's something here, and you'll definitely have fun for a couple of hours, but it's nowhere near what could've been." Nintendo Life awarded it 9 stars out of 10, praising its meticulously designed levels while writing, "Nova-111 is a fantastic puzzle action adventure game with a world that's built with care from its beautiful colours, rich in-depth quirky gameplay to its witty humour." Nintendo World Report gave the title the score is 8/10, where it states that the video game is fun and entertaining. Push Square gave the title 8 out of 10 stars, concluding, "Though [Nova-111] does have some flaws, such as a lacklustre auto-save feature and a cumbersome amount of abilities, you'll be hard pressed to find a weirder and more brilliant tribute to the men and women who changed the world through science."

Notes

References

External links

 
 

Adventure games
Adventure games set in space
2015 video games
Indie video games
Nintendo Switch games
PlayStation 3 games
PlayStation 4 games
PlayStation Vita games
Science fiction video games
Single-player video games
Video games developed in the United States
Video games set on fictional planets
Wii U games
Windows games
Xbox One games
Curve Games games
Funktronic Labs games